The 2018–19 season was the 120th in Athletic Club’s history and the 88th in the top tier.

Squad
According to the official website.

Player statistics

Disciplinary record

From the youth system

Transfer
In

Out

Staff
According to the official website:

Pre-season and friendlies

Competitions

Overview

La Liga

League table

Results summary

Result round by round

Matches

Copa del Rey

Round of 32

Round of 16

References

Athletic Bilbao seasons
Athletic Bilbao